Homfray's horseshoe bat (Rhinolophus andamanensis) is a species of bat in the family Rhinolophidae. It is endemic to the Andaman Islands. 

It is a medium-sized bat, with forearms of 46.7–56.6 mm. It was previously considered a subspecies of the intermediate horseshoe bat (R. affinis), from which it was separated based on morphometric, acoustic and molecular phylogeny criteria.

References

Rhinolophidae
Mammals described in 1872
Bats of India
Endemic fauna of the Andaman Islands